History of television in Taiwan. The television industry in Taiwan developed later than that in Europe and the United States.

Timeline

Black and white TV 
On March 4, 1961, the Taiwan provincial government set up the Taiwan Television career preparatory committee". On April 28, 1962, Taiwan Television was formally established.

Color TV
In 1967, President Chiang Kai-shek directed the integration of the above 12-second television applications, by the Broadcasting Corporation of China (BCC) combined with 28 private radio stations and some interested in the cause of television business and cultural circles raised funds to set up the second TV station, named "China Television Company".

Digital TV

Early forays to digital television started on Taiwan on July 1, 2004 so that main channels started to use SDTV format with analog signal which had been carried out for decades. Taiwan's first HDTV channel HiHD (which belonged to PTS) started on February 1, 2008 with test transmissions throughout the country, mainly in the northern region. Official broadcast began on May 15, 2008 and it spread its signals to Taipei and Kaohsiung. Its official launch would occur on July 24, 2012.

National Communications Commission terminated analog terrestrial television on June 30, 2012. By that time the main networks CTV, TTV, CTS, FTV and PTS fully transitioned to digital and with that ended 50 years of the analog signal in the country in the free-to-air frequency. On December 29, 2014 TTV upgraded its HD signal. Cable television would transition to digital by 2017.

Cable TV era

Vicious competition

Program classification system

References 

Television in Taiwan